The Private University of Trujillo (UPTP) is a Peruvian private university founded on October 11, 2006, in the city of Trujillo, La Libertad Region.

History
The National Council for the operating license of Universities (CONAFU) authorized the Private University of Trujillo to develop its academic activities on October 11, 2006, by Resolution No. 334-2006, CONAFU and ratified by Resolution No. 378-2010-CONAFU.

See also
National University of Trujillo
Cesar Vallejo University
Private University of the North

References

External links
Official website 

Universities in Trujillo, Peru